The Nissan VRH engine family consists of several racing engines built by Nissan Motor Company beginning in the late 1980s. All VRH engines are in a V8 configuration, with either natural aspiration or forced induction. Some VRH engines are loosely based on Nissan's production V8 engine blocks, including the VH and VK engines, while others were designed from the ground up for racing and share no components with production blocks.

The name "VRH" comes from the engines' V configuration ("V"), their purpose as racing engines ("R"), and the fact that all of them have eight cylinders (with "H" being the eighth letter of the Latin alphabet).

History
In 1987, Nissan began work on an engine exclusively for race use; the result was the VEJ30 engine, developed by Yoshikazu Ishikawa. This engine was based on old technology, and was not a success. For 1988, the VEJ30 was improved by Yoshimasa Hayashi and renamed the VRH30.

This engine was, however, still based on the obsolete VEJ30, and development of the all-new VRH35 was started in parallel with the VRH30. In 1989, the VRH35 appeared as a new development engine and was used in the Nissan R89C.

A 3.0-litre variant of the VRH35Z was also used in the 1998 Courage-Nissan C51 at the 1998 24 Hours of Le Mans. Both C51s failed to finish.

The design of the engine was later sold to McLaren, where it served as the basis of their M838T and M840T engines (which were used in all of McLaren's line-up since the McLaren MP4-12C).

VRH30T
The VRH30T was used in the R88C.
Cylinder Block: Aluminum 90° V8
Aspiration: Twin-Turbo (IHI)
Valvetrain: DOHC, 4 Valves per Cylinder
Displacement: 
Bore x Stroke: 
Power:  at 8000 rpm
Torque:  at 5500 rpm

VRH35Z
The VRH35Z first appeared in 1990 in the R90C.
Cylinder Block: Aluminum
Aspiration: Twin-Turbo (IHI)
Valvetrain: DOHC, 4 Valves per Cylinder
Displacement: 
Bore x Stroke: 
Compression Ratio: 8.5:1
Power:  at 7600 rpm
Torque:  at 5600 rpm
Engine Management: ECCS-R-NDIS
Weight:

VRH35L
In 1997, Nissan, working in partnership with Tom Walkinshaw Racing, fielded a VRH35L in the R390 GT1.
Cylinder Block: Aluminum
Aspiration: Twin-Turbo (IHI)
Valvetrain: DOHC, 4 Valves per Cylinder
Displacement: 
Bore x Stroke: 
Compression Ratio: 9.0:1
Power:  at 6800 rpm
Torque:  at 4400 rpm
Dry weight:

VRH35ADE
The VRH35ADE was used by Infiniti in their Indy race car.
Cylinder Block: Aluminum-alloy block and heads; molybdenum-coated pistons
Aspiration: Naturally Aspirated
Valvetrain: DOHC, 4 Valves per Cylinder
Displacement: 
Bore x Stroke: 
Compression Ratio: 13.8:1
Lubrication System: Multi-stage dry sump
Oil Capacity: 
Power:  at 10700 rpm
Torque:  at 10400 rpm

VRH40ADE
The VRH40ADE was used by Infiniti in their Indy race car.
Cylinder Block: Aluminum-alloy block and heads; molybdenum-coated pistons
Aspiration: Naturally Aspirated
Valvetrain: DOHC, 4 Valves per Cylinder
Displacement: 
Bore x Stroke: 
Compression Ratio: 14.5:1
Lubrication System: Multi-stage dry sump
Oil Capacity: 
Power:  at 10700 rpm
Torque:  at 8500 rpm

VRH34A
The VRH34A is one of two engines used in Nissan's GT500-spec GT-R.
Cylinder Block: Aluminum
Aspiration: Naturally Aspirated
Valvetrain: DOHC, 4 Valves per Cylinder
Displacement: 
Bore x Stroke: 
Power: 
Torque: Over 
Dry weight:  ?

VRH50A
The VRH50A was used in the Nissan R391.
Cylinder Block: Aluminum, Closed Deck
Aspiration: Naturally Aspirated
Valvetrain: DOHC, 4 Valves per Cylinder
Displacement: 
Bore x Stroke: 
Compression ratio: 14.0:1 (estimated)
Redline: 8000 rpm
Power:  at 7200 rpm
Torque:  at 6000 rpm
Engine Management: Nissan Electronics/Hitachi HN-1
Weight:

Other VRH engines
The VRH34A and VRH34B are naturally aspirated engines used by Nissan in their GT-R Super GT race car from 2010.

See also
 List of Nissan engines
 Nissan VEJ30 engine
 Nissan VH engine
 Nissan VK engine
 Nissan

References

VRH35
World Sportscar Championship engines
V8 engines
Engines by model
Gasoline engines by model
Group C